Mehdi Ben Dhifallah (born May 6, 1983 in Kelibia) is a Tunisian footballer. He currently plays as a striker.

Career
Ben Dhifallah scored his first league goal for Étoile du Sahel against Jendouba Sport during the 2nd round of the 2007-08 season. He has also played for Étoile du Sahel in the 2007 CAF Champions League., Ben Dhifallah joined Étoile Sportive du Sahel from Tunisian Ligue Professionnelle 1 rival Espérance Sportive de Zarzis in June 2007. In February 2010 moving to Libyan Premier League club Nasr.

2015 Mehdi Ben Dhifallah for the first time feel the atmosphere of the rigors of the Indonesian League campaign with the team this year Bali United F.C.
"The first time I strengthen the team in the Southeast Asian region and I chose to join in an Indonesian Super League club, I heard the competition in Indonesia is the most prestigious competition in South East Asia and even to Asia, so I am keen to pursue a career here with Bali United F.C.".

References

External links
 Player profile at Etoile-du-sahel.com

1983 births
Living people
Tunisian footballers
Association football forwards
ES Zarzis players
Tunisia international footballers
2008 Africa Cup of Nations players
Tunisian expatriate footballers
Expatriate footballers in Libya
Expatriate footballers in Jordan
Expatriate footballers in Sudan
Expatriate footballers in Poland
Tunisian expatriate sportspeople in Libya
Tunisian expatriate sportspeople in Jordan
Tunisian expatriate sportspeople in Sudan
Tunisian expatriate sportspeople in Poland
Shabab Al-Ordon Club players
Étoile Sportive du Sahel players
Al-Nasr SC (Benghazi) players
Widzew Łódź players
Ekstraklasa players
Al-Merrikh SC players
Stade Tunisien players
Libyan Premier League players